Pseudobrookite is an iron titanium oxide mineral with formula: Fe2TiO5 or (Fe3+,Fe2+)2(2+)O5.

Discovery and occurrence
Pseudobrookite was first described in 1878 for an occurrence in Uroi Hill (Arany Hill), Simeria, Hunedoara County, Romania. The name is from Greek ψευδής, for false, and brookite because of its misleading similar appearance to brookite.

Pseudobrookite forms as pneumatolytic deposition and alteration within titanium-rich volcanic rocks such as andesite, rhyolite or basalt. It may be associated with xenoliths contained in the volcanics. It also commonly occurs in lithophysae.

It occurs associated with hematite, magnetite, bixbyite, ilmenite, enstatite-ferrosilite, tridymite, quartz, sanidine, topaz, spessartine, beryl, mica, cassiterite and apatite.

Occurrences include:
 Mayen in the Eifel district, Germany
 Mont Dore, Puy-de-Dome, France
 Vesuvius, Italy
 Jumilla, Murcia Province, Spain
 Faial and São Miguel Islands, Azores 
 Kilimanjaro, Tanzania;
 Reunion Island
 the Thomas Range, Juab County, Utah
 Crater Lake and Lemolo Lake, Oregon
 the Black Range, Sierra County, New Mexico
 Cerro los Remedios, Durango, Mexico

References

Oxide minerals
Orthorhombic minerals
Minerals in space group 63